Megan Kelso (born 1968 in Seattle, Washington) is an American comic book artist and writer.

Early life and education 
Kelso received her B.A. from Evergreen State University, where she studied history and political science.

Career 
Kelso started working in the 1990s, with the minicomic, Girlhero, which won her a Xeric Foundation grant in 1993. She has since published several other projects including Queen of the Black Black and The Squirrel Mother. In 2004, she was the editor of the female cartoonist anthology, Scheherazade: Stories of Love, Treachery, Mothers, and Monsters (published by Soft Skull Press). This anthology showcases the work of 23 major female graphic novelists of the time, including veteran and emergent graphic novelists.

From April 1 to September 9, 2007, Kelso published a weekly comic strip in The New York Times Magazine titled Watergate Sue. Her Artichoke Tales  graphic novel for Fantagraphics Books was published in 2010. She is currently working on her third collection of short stories. 

Among many other publications, Kelso had a story (which she co-created with Ron Rege) in SPX 2004, the annual anthology published by Small Press Expo (SPX). Kelso has also created work for several magazines, including the now-defunct Tower Records' Pulse Magazine.

She received two Ignatz Awards in 2002, for Outstanding Artist (for Artichoke Tales #1 and her story in Non #5) and Outstanding Minicomic (for Artichoke Tales #1).

Kelso has develop and led a workshop, "Comics for Writers," at various events, including the 2014 Seattle Graphic Novel Panel, hosted by the Graphic Artists Guild and sponsored by Fantagraphics.

Selected Bibliography 
The Squirrel Mother: Stories (2006), Fantagraphics Books

Artichoke Tales (2010), Fantagraphics Books

Queen of the Black Black (2011), Fantagraphics Books

Who Will Make the Pancakes: Five Stories (2022) Fantagraphics Books

Personal life 
She is married and lives with her husband and daughter in Seattle, Washington.

External links
 
 NYTimes Magazine strip
 Ellen Forney, Megan Kelso and Raina Telgemeier on Process at The Comics Journal

1968 births
Living people
Alternative cartoonists
American women cartoonists
American female comics artists
American comics writers
Female comics writers
Artists from Seattle
Ignatz Award winners for Outstanding Artist
20th-century American artists
20th-century American women artists
21st-century American women artists
American cartoonists
Evergreen State College alumni

References